Jay Bridger (born 23 September 1987, in Kent) is a British racing driver.

Bridger began racing in karts at the age of 8, winning four karting championships before starting his professional career in British Formula Ford in 2006. He finished fifth in the championship in 2007 and finished sixth in the Duratec class at the Formula Ford Festival and 10th in the Walter Hayes Trophy. In 2008 he moved to the British Formula Three Championship and won the National Class. He moved to the main championship in 2009 and finished 15th in points. In 2010 he improved to 14th overall. He now runs his own team, Bridger Motorsport, as well as racing part-time.

External links
 Official website
 

1987 births
Living people
English racing drivers
Formula Ford drivers
British Formula Three Championship drivers
People from Kent
Fluid Motorsport Development drivers
Team West-Tec drivers